Cydia conspicua is a moth of the family Tortricidae. It is endemic to the Hawaiian islands of Oahu and Maui.

The larvae feed on Acacia koa. They have been found on dead bark and seeds of their host plant.

Notes

References

Grapholitini
Endemic moths of Hawaii
Moths described in 1907